is a Japanese singer and live streamer. He is a member of the J-pop group Strawberry Prince.

Biography 

Satomi was recruited by Nanamori to join Strawberry Prince in mid-2016. On September 9, 2019, he released his first solo mini-album, Memories. It placed second on the Oricon weekly album ranking and first on the Oricon daily album ranking.

On August 19, 2021, Satomi released an official fanbook, Satomi Memory. The book ranked first on the Oricon weekly book ranking.

Discography

Mini albums

Singles

Filmography

Anime

References

External links 

 Official YouTube channel

Living people
Japanese male pop singers
1993 births
Utaite
Japanese YouTubers
People from Tokyo